Alexia Viruez (born May 4, 1994) is a Bolivian beauty pageant titleholder and model who was crowned Miss Bolivia 2012, and represented her country in the 2013 Miss Universe.

Early life 
On May 4, 1994, Viruez was born in Santa Cruz, Bolivia. Viruez was raised in Santa Cruz, Bolivia. When Viruez was nine years old, Alexia was awarded a modeling scholarship.

Education 
Viruez graduated from Nueva America. In 2012, Viruez was studying psychology at   Universidad de Aquino Bolivia.

Career 
Viruez started her career as a model.

Pageants

Miss Bolivia 2012
On May 31, 2012, Viruez competed in the 2012 Miss Universe Bolivia pageant and won. At 18 years old, Viruez was crowned as the 2012 Miss Bolivia. Viruez will represent Bolivia at Reina Hispanoamericana 2012 and Miss Universe 2013.

Reina Hispanoamericana 2012
Viruez represented Bolivia at Reina Hispanoamericana 2012 in her hometown of Santa Cruz where she finished as 1st Runner-Up.

Miss Universe 2013
On November 9, 2013, Viruez represented Bolivia at Miss Universe 2013 in Moscow, Russia. Although considered a favorite and a front runner, she failed to place in the semifinals.

References

External links
 Official Alexia Viruez website

1994 births
Living people
People from Santa Cruz de la Sierra
Bolivian beauty pageant winners
Miss Universe 2013 contestants
Bolivian female models